Terence Brain (April 1955 – 25 March 2016) was a British animator known for his work on programmes such as The Trap Door and Wallace & Gromit. He died at his home after a two-year battle with cancer.

References

External links
 

1954 births
2016 deaths
Film people from Bristol
British animators
Aardman Animations people